Paski Mahalleh (also Romanized as Pāskī Maḩalleh; also known as Kateh Posht-e Soflá and Koteh Posht-e Pāsagī Maḩalleh) is a village in Bala Khiyaban-e Litkuh Rural District, in the Central District of Amol County, Mazandaran Province, Iran. At the 2006 census, its population was 249, in 62 families.

References 

Populated places in Amol County